Charles Bennett Williams was an Australian politician. He was a Labor member of the Western Australian Legislative Council (for South Province) from 1928 to 1948.

References

Year of birth missing
Year of death missing
Members of the Western Australian Legislative Council
Place of birth missing
Australian Labor Party members of the Parliament of Western Australia